Mala Solina  is a village in Croatia.

References

External links

Populated places in Sisak-Moslavina County
Glina, Croatia